William H. Moore was a state legislator in North Carolina. He served in the North Carolina House of Representatives during the Reconstruction era. He represented New Hanover County and served with other African Americans in the state legislature. His post office was in Wilmington, North Carolina.
He served with Henry Brewington and Alfred Lloyd who also represented New Hanover in the 1874-1875 session. All three were African Americans.

See also
African-American officeholders during and following the Reconstruction era

References

Year of birth missing
African-American politicians
Members of the North Carolina House of Representatives
Year of death missing
Date of birth missing
Date of death missing